Luis Ramirez or Luis Ramírez may refer to:

Sports 
Luis Ramírez de Lucena (c. 1465-c. 1530), Spanish chess player
Luis Ramírez (gymnast) (born 1948), Cuban Olympic gymnast
Luis Ramírez Zapata (born 1954), former Salvodoran footballer
Luis Ramírez (footballer, born 1984), Peruvian football midfielder
Luis Ramírez (footballer, born 1977), Honduran football striker
Luís Ramírez (footballer, born 1997), Venezuelan football midfielder

Others
Luis L. Ramirez (1963-2005), convicted murderer, executed in Texas in 2005
Luis Alberto Ramírez, bass guitarist for Colombian heavy metal band Kraken

See also
José Luis Ramírez (born 1958), Mexican boxer
José Luis Ramírez (racing driver) (born 1979), Mexican NASCAR driver